Aakaru is a village in Kambja Parish, Tartu County in eastern Estonia.

References

Villages in Tartu County